Hypomolis roseicincta is a moth of the family Erebidae. It was described by Paul Dognin in 1913. It is found in Colombia.

References

 Natural History Museum Lepidoptera generic names catalog

Arctiini
Moths described in 1913